Louis Spohr's String Quartet No. 30 ("Quatuor brillant") in A major, Op. 93, was completed in September of 1835, it is one of eight such works Spohr wrote between 1806 and 1835. He would not write another string quartet for ten years.

Movements
This quartet is in three movement form:
Andante – Allegro
Larghetto
Rondo: Allegretto

References

External links
 Score for the String Quartet No. 30 in A major, Op. 93 at the IMSLP

30
1835 compositions
Compositions in A major